Sityodtong USA, also known as Team Sityodtong, is a Muay Thai and mixed martial arts training camp based out of Somerville, Massachusetts. The headquarters of Sityodtong Camp is in Pattaya, Thailand.  Its Grandmaster is Yodtong Senanan and he has produced 57 Muay Thai Champions, the largest number in the history of Muay Thai in Thailand. The owner and head trainer of Sityodtong Boston, Mark DellaGrotte, is a teacher of various styles of Muay Thai such as Mae Mai Muay Thai, Pradal Serey, Muay Boran, Muay Lao, and also Burmese Boxing. The team members includes MMA fighters such as Marcus Davis, Dale Hartt, and  Patrick Côté.

Between UFC 67 and UFC 85, Team Sityodtong did not lose a fight in the UFC.

Training locations

References

External links
 Team Sityodtong Official Site

Kickboxing training facilities
Mixed martial arts training facilities
Sports in Boston
Muay Thai